Razlog is a town and ski resort in Razlog Municipality, Blagoevgrad Province in southwestern Bulgaria. It is situated in the Razlog Valley and was first mentioned during the reign of Byzantine emperor Basil II.

The municipality
The municipality of Razlog comprises the villages of Banya, Gorno Draglishte, Dolno Draglishte, Dobarsko, Bachevo, Godlevo and Eleshnitsa with a total population of 20,410 inhabitants. Each has its own charm.

The fairy-tale village of Dobarsko, hidden in the outskirts of Rila, maintains the legends of the Dobarsko Singing School. One can see here the church "Saints Theodor Tiron and Theodor Stratilat" (1614) — a National Monument of Culture with high architectural and artistic culture. The murals depicting Jesus Christ in what observers claim to be a jet rocket astonishes foreigners as well as Bulgarians. The icons in the Tzar (King) Row of church "Sretenie Gospodne" (1860) were painted by Simeon D. Molerov, a representative of the Bansko Painting School.

History

During his 1894–1896 trip in the region of Macedonia, Bulgarian geographer Vasil Kanchov visited Razlog (then known as Мехомия, Mehomiya) and reported that it numbered 820 households, of which 500 of Eastern Orthodox Bulgarians, 300 of Muslim Bulgarians (Pomaks), 16 of Protestant Bulgarians and 5 of Eastern Orthodox Aromanians, for a total population of around 4,620. According to the same author's 1900 study on the population of Macedonia, Razlog was populated by 4,970 people, of which 3,200 Christian Bulgarians, 1,460 Muslim Bulgarians, 80 Turks, 200 Romani and 30 Aromanians.

The town's population actively participated in the Kresna-Razlog and Ilinden-Preobrazhenie Uprising, Razlog, which was part of the Sanjak of Siroz in the Salonika Vilayet as "Razlık", itself being liberated from Ottoman rule in 1912.

In 1925, the town was renamed from Mehomia to Razlog.

The municipality of Razlog and the whole Razlog valley possess rich inheritance of cultural monuments from different ages and civilizations. There are seven cultural monuments in the territory of Razlog. These are the Christian temples: Saint Georgi Pobedonoset (built in 1834 in Razlog); Saint Gerogii (built in 1834 in Banya village); Uspenie Bogorodichno (built in 1835 in Dolno Draglishte village) — the iconostasis in this temple was made by one of the most prominent representatives of the wood-carving school in Tryavna: Dosyu Koyuv; Saint Bogoroditsa in Dolno Draglishte village, specialists suppose that the temple was built before the 16th century; Sretenie Gospodne (built in 1860 in Dobarsko village); and Saint Theodor Тiron and Theodor Stratilat (built in 1614 in Dobarsko village). This temple has unique mural paintings; it is a cultural monument under the protection of UNESCO.

There are 70 houses in the municipality, which are archeological monuments. They are mainly from the age of the Revival — the so-called "Razlog-Chepino" houses.

The historic museum in Razlog presents a collection of pottery from the 19-20th century, local traditional hand-made textiles and bell-mouldings.

During the Second Balkan War (1913), the area around the town was a major battlefield between the Greek and Bulgarian armies. The town was captured by the Greek forces on July 9 (O.S.), recaptured by the Bulgarians on July 16, and again to the Greeks on July 18. After the following peace treaty Razlog was ceded to Bulgaria.

Razlog developed as a centre of winter tourism in the 1990s and 2000s owing to its favourable position in the vicinity of the Pirin, Rila and Rhodope mountains.

Culture

Razlog is a town with rich cultural traditions and customs kept through the centuries with the spirit of original Bulgarian values.

Two of the most significant folklore events in Bulgaria are organized and held in Razlog. These are the New Year's Kukeri holidays and the gathering for folk art "Pirin sings".

Proof for the original kukeri traditions is the insignia of honour, given to the municipality of Razlog by Henri Van der Kroon, president of the International Federation of European and Mediterranean carnival towns in May 2004. As a member of this federation, the kukeri groups from the municipality of Razlog regularly participate in the events organised by it.

Unique is the gathering for folk art "Pirin songs", which is visited on a mass scale and takes one of the leading positions in organization and artistic organization. The gathering in the "Yavorov" hut has become tradition in the recent years. The hut is one of the most visited locations in the Pirin mountain. It was built 72 years ago and during the summer season it turns out to be small for numerous tourists. Interests for the tourists are local "valevitsi, craftsmen's shops and culinary art of Razlog with the scent of the    "kapama", "chumlek", "church's beans", "sugrena banitsa", etc. Of great interest are also the Easter and Christmas holiday, religious and general life customs, such as Todor's day (horse race), Voditsi (celebration of Yordan's day with throwing of a cross into water), Grandmother's day, Proshki, etc.

Education and sports
A big part of the specialized schools in the region are in Razlog; they provide qualified labor for the sectors of the economy and development in the municipality.

The education network in the Municipality of Razlog comprises nine municipality schools, two of which are primary, six secondary, there is one school with special classes in English, Mathematics with German; there are also four national schools. Specialists in the field of business administration and management in hotels and culinary arts, electronics, transportation, and agriculture are prepared in the professional high school of tourism, the professional transport high school and professional mechanization and agriculture high school.

In 1999 "ASIX"-Razlog was established, a club for martial arts, in which about 60 children train actively. The members of this club have won many prizes from republican, Balkan and international tournaments. There were more than 30 medals from the republican tournament in Karate-do and Ju-jitsu in 2006.

Other sports developed in the municipality are volleyball, football, taekwondo, chess and sport orientation. The most developed sport in the town is volleyball. The local team Pirin (Razlog) is among the best teams in the elite volleyball division in Bulgaria and often produces players for the national volleyball teams of the country. The football team has achieved good results for the last several years and now it is taking part in the second professional division in Bulgaria.

Nature
Nature is the greatest asset of Razlog valley. North of the town is the kingdom of the Rila National Park. Pirin rises to the south — the mountain that Slavs called "Mountain of Gods" (Perun). The Pirin National Park is included in the convention for the Preservation of World Natural and Cultural Heritage Sites. In Pirin, there are more than 100 bird species and over 1100 plant species among which is the symbol of the mountain: the edelweiss. There are 42 mammal species: chamois, bears and others.

The most precious parts of Pirin are designated reserves. "Bayuvi Dupki - Djinjiritsa" is a biosphere reserve under the auspices of UNESCO, where unique formations of white and Macedonian and Bosnian pine trees are to be found, together with more than 27 Bulgarian and 43 Balkan relict species.

Investments
In recent years the municipality of Razlog has attracted foreign investment, connected to the development of modern technologies in the fields of machine-building, electronics, and furniture production.

For the period 2005-2006 projects for near 50 million levs were implemented, and the investments applied for the beginning of 2006 were 100 million euro. The biggest private sites are the resort complex "Katarino SPA", "Hotel Razlog" with total investment of near 15 million euro. Of the foreign investments, the biggest are cleaning station for waste water for 6 million euro and road II-19 "Simitli-Razlog-Sadovo" which connects Bulgaria and Greece for 20 million euro.

The Pirin Golf & Country Club complex is in the Betolovoto location, at the foot of the Pirin mountain, with views to the Rila and Rodopi mountains. Besides the golf course with 18 holes and service buildings, the complex includes construction of a "Welcome zone" with car park, residential zone, center (commercial center, restaurants, cafes), horse base, and sports complex.

Imminent is the realization of a project including completion of ski-zone "Kulinoto", building of water park and other concomitant structures.

At the moment there are perspective researches for supplying Bansko, Razlog, Dobrinishte village and Banya village with natural gas, after which the construction of gas-conveying and distributing networks may begin in the locations foreseen for gasification.

Twin towns

 Pineto, Italy (since 2016 in the frameworks of the SISTERS Twinning project)
 Šibenik, Croatia (since 2016 in the frameworks of the SISTERS Twinning project)

Cityscape

See also
Razlog Cove on Livingston Island in the South Shetland Islands, Antarctica, which is named after Razlog.

References

External links

 Official website of Razlog
 Razlog Online — news from Razlog and its district
 Information portal of Razlog and Bansko — hotels, news, forum, ski conditions

Towns in Bulgaria
Populated places in Blagoevgrad Province